Mount Gardiner is a ridge-like granitic mountain,  high, standing  east of Mount Ruth and just south of the junction of Bartlett Glacier and Scott Glacier, in the Queen Maud Mountains of Antarctica. It was discovered in December 1934 by the Byrd Antarctic Expedition geological party under Quin Blackburn, and named by Richard E. Byrd for Joseph T. Gardiner of Wellington, New Zealand, agent for the Byrd Antarctic Expeditions of 1928–30 and 1933–35.

References

Mountains of the Ross Dependency
Amundsen Coast